Antonio Longoria (August 14, 1890 - December 31, 1970) was a scientist who claimed to have invented a death ray in the 1930s.

Biography
He was born in Madrid, Spain, on August 14, 1890. He received his degree in engineering and a Ph.D. in medicine. In 1911 he emigrated to the United States. He moved to Cleveland, Ohio, where he married and had three children. He became the president of the Sterling Electrical Company. He became a naturalized US citizen on December 29, 1919. He claimed in 1936 that patents for his process for welding ferrous and nonferrous metals by his "invisible ray" were sold for $6,000,000. He died on New Year's Eve, December 31, 1970, in Winter Park, Florida.

External  links

References

1890 births
1970 deaths
Pseudoscientific physicists
People with acquired American citizenship
Spanish emigrants to the United States